Mean Old Man is the 40th studio album by rock and roll pioneer Jerry Lee Lewis. Like his previous album Last Man Standing, this album features duets with famous artists.

Track listing
"Mean Old Man" (with Ronnie Wood) (2:46)
"Rockin' My Life Away" (with Kid Rock & Slash) (2:16)
"Dead Flowers" (with Mick Jagger) (3:52)
"Middle Age Crazy" (with Tim McGraw & Jon Brion) (3:44)
"You Can Have Her" (with Eric Clapton & James Burton) (2:37)
"You Are My Sunshine" (with Sheryl Crow & Jon Brion) (3:35)
"Hold You In My Heart" (with Shelby Lynne) (2:41)
"Swinging Doors" (with Merle Haggard & James Burton) (2:40)
"Roll Over Beethoven" (with Ringo Starr, John Mayer, James "Hutch" Hutchinson, Jim Keltner & Jon Brion) (2:45)
"Sweet Virginia" (with Keith Richards) (3:50)
"Railroad to Heaven" (with Solomon Burke) (3:55)
"Bad Moon Rising" (with John Fogerty) (2:17)
"Please Release Me" (with Gillian Welch) (3:39)
"Whiskey River" (with Willie Nelson) (3:19)
"I Really Don’t Want to Know" (with Gillian Welch) (3:03)
"Sunday Morning Coming Down" (5:07)
"Will the Circle Be Unbroken" (with Mavis Staples, Robbie Robertson & Nils Lofgren) (3:48)
"Miss the Mississippi and You" (3:25)
"Here Comes That Rainbow" (with Shelby Lynne) (2:06)

Chart performance

References

External links

 Mean Old Man at All Music

2010 albums
Jerry Lee Lewis albums
Vocal duet albums
Verve Records albums
Covers albums
Albums produced by Steve Bing
Albums produced by Jim Keltner